Nir Galim (lit. Waves Meadow) is a religious moshav shitufi in south-central Israel, adjacent to the city of Ashdod. Located in the southern coastal plain, it falls under the jurisdiction of Hevel Yavne Regional Council.

History
The  moshav was established in 1949, on land which had belonged to the Palestinian village of Arab Suqrir, which was depopulated in the 1948 Arab–Israeli War.

It was initially called Nir VeGal (lit. Meadow and Wave). The founders were Holocaust survivors from Hungary and Central Europe, including a set of twins who survived Josef Mengele's experiments.

The Testimony House for the Heritage of the Holocaust was established on the moshav in 2009.

Notable residents
Ofir Ben Shitrit, Orthodox Jewish singer

References

Moshavim
Religious Israeli communities
Populated places established in 1949
Populated places in Central District (Israel)
1949 establishments in Israel
Hungarian-Jewish culture in Israel